Nilson Machado dos Santos (born 24 January 1973), commonly known as Biro Jade, was a Brazil born, Azerbaijani futsal player who plays for Araz Naxçivan as a field player. He won Golden Boot award as join top scorer with five goals in UEFA European Futsal Championship 2010. He is now an assistant manager in Azerbaijan national futsal team.

Honours
 European Futsal Golden Boot winner: (2010)

References

1973 births
Living people
Azerbaijani men's futsal players
Uragan Ivano-Frankivsk players